Goniopteris is a genus of ferns in the family Thelypteridaceae, subfamily Thelypteridoideae, in the Pteridophyte Phylogeny Group classification of 2016 (PPG I). Other sources sink Goniopteris into a very broadly defined genus Thelypteris.

Species
, the Checklist of Ferns and Lycophytes of the World accepted the following species:

Goniopteris abdita 
Goniopteris abrupta 
Goniopteris alan-smithiana 
Goniopteris alata 
Goniopteris amazonica 
Goniopteris ancyriothrix 
Goniopteris anoptera 
Goniopteris asplenioides 
Goniopteris aureola 
Goniopteris beckeriana 
Goniopteris berlinii 
Goniopteris bermudiana 
Goniopteris bibrachiata 
Goniopteris biformata 
Goniopteris biolleyi 
Goniopteris blanda 
Goniopteris bradei 
Goniopteris brittonae 
Goniopteris burkartii 
Goniopteris calypso 
Goniopteris chocoensis 
Goniopteris clarkei 
Goniopteris clypeata 
Goniopteris coalescens 
Goniopteris cordata 
Goniopteris costaricensis 
Goniopteris crassipila 
Goniopteris croatii 
Goniopteris crypta 
Goniopteris cumingiana 
Goniopteris cuneata 
Goniopteris curta 
Goniopteris cutiataensis 
Goniopteris devolvens 
Goniopteris dissimulans 
Goniopteris eggersii 
Goniopteris equitans 
Goniopteris erythrothrix 
Goniopteris francoana 
Goniopteris fraseri 
Goniopteris gemmulifera 
Goniopteris ghiesbreghtii 
Goniopteris goeldii 
Goniopteris gonophora 
Goniopteris hastata 
Goniopteris hatchii 
Goniopteris hildae 
Goniopteris holodictya 
Goniopteris hondurensis 
Goniopteris iguapensis 
Goniopteris imbricata 
Goniopteris imitata 
Goniopteris incisa 
Goniopteris indusiata 
Goniopteris jamesonii 
Goniopteris jarucoensis 
Goniopteris juruensis 
Goniopteris killipii 
Goniopteris leonina 
Goniopteris leptocladia 
Goniopteris levyi 
Goniopteris liebmannii 
Goniopteris littoralis 
Goniopteris lugubriformis 
Goniopteris lugubris 
Goniopteris macrotis 
Goniopteris martinezii 
Goniopteris minor 
Goniopteris minutissima 
Goniopteris monosora 
Goniopteris montana 
Goniopteris moranii 
Goniopteris munchii 
Goniopteris multigemmifera 
Goniopteris nephrodioides 
Goniopteris nicaraguensis 
Goniopteris nigricans 
Goniopteris obliterata 
Goniopteris oroniensis 
Goniopteris paranaensis 
Goniopteris paucijuga 
Goniopteris paucipinnata 
Goniopteris pellita 
Goniopteris pennata 
Goniopteris peripae 
Goniopteris peripaeoides 
Goniopteris pilonensis 
Goniopteris pinnatifida 
Goniopteris platypes 
Goniopteris poiteana 
Goniopteris praetermissa 
Goniopteris radicans 
Goniopteris redunca 
Goniopteris refracta 
Goniopteris resiliens 
Goniopteris retroflexa 
Goniopteris rhachiflexuosa 
Goniopteris sagittata 
Goniopteris salinoi 
Goniopteris sapechoana 
Goniopteris scabra 
Goniopteris schaffneri 
Goniopteris schippii 
Goniopteris schomburgkii 
Goniopteris schunkei 
Goniopteris schwackeana 
Goniopteris sclerophylla 
Goniopteris seidleri 
Goniopteris semihastata 
Goniopteris semirii 
Goniopteris septemjuga 
Goniopteris serrulata 
Goniopteris skinneri 
Goniopteris smithii 
Goniopteris stephanii 
Goniopteris stolzeana 
Goniopteris subdimorpha 
Goniopteris subsagittata 
Goniopteris tannensis 
Goniopteris tenebrica 
Goniopteris tenera 
Goniopteris tetragona 
Goniopteris toganetra 
Goniopteris tristis 
Goniopteris tryoniorum 
Goniopteris tuxtlensis 
Goniopteris urbani 
Goniopteris venusta 
Goniopteris verecunda 
Goniopteris vivipara 
Goniopteris windischii 
Goniopteris yaucoensis

References

Thelypteridaceae
Fern genera